Sigmarszell is a municipality in the district of Lindau in Bavaria in Germany. It lies on the border with Austria, few kilometers from the Lake Bodensee.

References

Lindau (district)